Zeena Parkins (born 1956) is an American composer and multi-instrumentalist active in experimental, free improvised, contemporary classical, and avant-jazz music; she is known for having "reinvented the harp". Parkins performs on standard harps, several custom electric harps, piano, and accordion. She is a 2019 Guggenheim Fellow and professor in the Music Department at Mills College.

Life and career
Born in 1956 in Detroit, Michigan, Parkins studied at Bard College and moved to New York City in 1984.

Her work ranges from solo performance to large ensembles. Besides standard and electric harps, her work also incorporates Foley, field recordings, analog synthesizers, samplers, oscillators and homemade instruments.

She has recorded six solo harp records and recorded and performed with Björk, Matmos, Ikue Mori, Fred Frith, Tom Cora, Christian Marclay, Yoko Ono, John Zorn (including in Cobra performances), Chris Cutler, Pauline Oliveros, Nels Cline, Elliott Sharp, Lee Ranaldo, Butch Morris, Tin Hat Trio, William Winant, Anthony Braxton, Bobby Previte, Courtney Love's band Hole, and others. She has also been a member of a number of experimental rock bands, including No Safety, News from Babel, and Skeleton Crew.

Parkins has often worked with dance companies and choreographers, including the John Jasperse Company, Jennifer Monson, Neil Greenberg, Emmanuelle Vo-Dinh, BodyCartography Project, and Jennifer Lacey, and has won three Bessie Awards for her achievement in composition for dance. She has also provided scores for filmmakers including Abigail Child, Isabella Rossellini, Cynthia Madansky, Mandy MacIntosh, and Daria Martin. Parkins received a 1997 Foundation for Contemporary Arts Grants to Artists Award.

Discography

As leader

Collaborations 

with News from Babel
 Work Resumed on the Tower (Recommended, 1984); Parkins, Chris Cutler, Lindsay Cooper, Dagmar Krause
 Letters Home (Recommended, 1986); Parkins, Cutler, Cooper, Krause ft. Robert Wyatt, Dagmar Krause, Sally Potter, Phil Minton
with Ikue Mori
 Parkins & Mori, Phantom Orchard (Mego, 2004)
 Phantom Orchard, Orra (Tzadik, 2008); ft. Cyro Baptista, Makigami Koichi, Josh Quillen, Maja Solveig Kjelstrup Ratkje
 Phantom Orchard Orchestra, Trouble In Paradise (Tzadik, 2012); ft. Sara Parkins, Shayna Dunkelman, Ratkje, Maggie Parkins, Hild Sofie Tafjord
 Phantom Orchard Ensemble, Through the Looking Glass (Tzadik, 2014); ft. Sylvie Courvoisier, S. Parkins, Ratkje, M. Parkins
with No Safety
 This Lost Leg (RecRec Music, 1989); Parkins, Chris Cochrane, Doug Seidel, Ann Rupel, Pippin Branett
 Spill (Knitting Factory Works, 1992); Parkins, Cochrane, Seidel, Rupel, Tim Spelios
 Live at the Knitting Factory (Knitting Factory Works, 1993); Parkins, Cochrane, Seidel, Rupel, Spelios
 Live in Italy (Cuneiform Records, 2021)
with Elliott Sharp
 Elliott Sharp / Zeena Parkins, Psycho–Acoustic (Victo, 1994)
 Psycho-Acoustic, Blackburst (Victo, 1996)
with Skeleton Crew
 The Country of Blinds (Rift, 1986); Parkins, Fred Frith, Tom Cora
 Free Dirt (Live) (Klanggalerie, 2021); Parkins, Frith, Cora
Other collaborations
 OWT (Parkins & David Linton), Good As Gold (Homestead Records, 1989)
 Joane Hétu / Diane Labrosse / Parkins / Danielle P. Roger / Tenko, La Légende De La Pluie (Ambiances Magnétiques, 1992)
 William Hooker / Lee Ranaldo / Parkins, The Gift Of Tongues (Knitting Factory Works, 1995)
 Chris Cutler / Parkins, Shark! (Megacorp, 1999)
 Parkins / Nels Cline / Thurston Moore, Live At Easthampton Town Hall (JMZ, 2001)
 Weightless Animals (Parkins, Kaffe Matthews, Mandy McIntosh), Weightless Animals (Annette Works, 2004)
 Parkins, Frederic Rzewski, James Tenney, Music for String Quartet & Percussion (New World Records, 2013); with Eclipse Quartet (S. Parkins, Sarah Thornblade, Alma Lisa Fernandez, M. Parkins) and William Winant
 Parkins / Pauline Oliveros, Presença Series #01 (Lucky Kitchen / Fundação de Serralves, 2015)
 MZM (Myra Melford, Parkins, Miya Masaoka), MZM (Infrequent Seams, 2017)
 Green Dome (Parkins, Ryan Sawyer, Ryan Ross Smith), Thinking in Stitches (Case Study Records, 2019)
 Parkins / Brian Chase, Live at San Damiano Mission (Chaikin Records / Case Study Records, 2019)
 Parkins / Wobbly, Triplicates (Relative Pitch Records, 2019)
 Parkins / Jeff Kolar, SCALE (Two Rooms, 2019)
 Parkins / Mette Rasmussen / Ryan Sawyer, Glass Triangle (Relative Pitch, 2021)

As instrumentalist 
With Björk
 Telegram (One Little Indian, 1996)
 Vespertine (One Little Indian, 2001)
 Drawing Restraint 9 (One Little Indian, 2005)
 Biophilia (One Little Indian, 2011)
With Alex Cline
 For People in Sorrow (Cryptogramophone, 2013)
With Nels Cline
 The Inkling (Cryptogramophone, 2000)
 Destroy All Nels Cline (Atavistic, 2001)
 Macroscope (Mack Avenue, 2014)
 Lovers (Blue Note, 2016)
With Fred Frith
 The Country of Blinds (Rift, 1986) as Skeleton Crew
 Step Across the Border (RecRec, 1990)
 That House We Lived In (Fred, 1991 [2003])
 Stone, Brick, Glass, Wood, Wire (I Dischi di Angelica, 1999)
 Traffic Continues (Winter & Winter, 2000) with Ensemble Modern
 Ragged Atlas (Intakt, 2010) as Cosa Brava
 The Letter (Intakt, 2012) as Cosa Brava
With Maybe Monday
 Unsquare (Intakt, 2008)
With Yoko Ono
 Blueprint for a Sunrise (Capitol, 2001)
With Marc Ribot
 Requiem for What's His Name (Les Disques du Crépuscule, 1992)
With John Zorn
 Cobra (Hat Hut, 1987)
 John Zorn's Cobra: Live at the Knitting Factory (Knitting Factory, 1997)
 The Bribe (Tzadik, 1998)
With Tin Hat Trio
 Book of Silk (Ropeadope/Rykodisc, 2004)
With Bobby Previte
 Terminals (Cantaloupe, 2014)

Notes

External links

 AllMusic Discography

American jazz harpists
American rock harpists
Living people
1956 births
Tzadik Records artists
Avant-garde jazz musicians
American experimental musicians
Mills College faculty
American women in electronic music
Musicians from Detroit
Skeleton Crew (band) members
20th-century American musicians
20th-century American women musicians
21st-century American musicians
21st-century American women musicians
Jazz musicians from Michigan
News from Babel members
Atavistic Records artists
American women academics
Jazz harpists